Timirovo (Timer) is a rural locality (a village) in Timirovsky Selsoviet, Burzyansky District, Bashkortostan, Russia. The population was 462 as of 2010. There are 3 streets.

Geography 
Timirovo is located 25 km northeast of Starosubkhangulovo (the district's administrative centre) by road. Staromunasipovo is the nearest rural locality.

References 

Rural localities in Burzyansky District